This is a list of people who have served as Custos Rotulorum of Northamptonshire.

 Sir Edward Montagu bef. 1544–1557
 William Cecil, 1st Baron Burghley bef. 1564 – aft. 1584
 Thomas Cecil, 1st Earl of Exeter bef. 1594–1623
 Francis Manners, 6th Earl of Rutland 1623–1625
 Francis Fane, 1st Earl of Westmorland 1625–1629
 William Spencer, 2nd Baron Spencer 1629–1636
 Sir Christopher Hatton 1636–1646
 Interregnum
 Edward Montagu, 2nd Earl of Manchester 1660–1671
 James Compton, 3rd Earl of Northampton 1671–1681
 Christopher Hatton, 1st Viscount Hatton 1681–1689
 Charles Mordaunt, 1st Earl of Monmouth 1689
 Christopher Hatton, 1st Viscount Hatton 1689–1706
 vacant
 George Brudenell, 3rd Earl of Cardigan 1711–1714
 Charles Mordaunt, 3rd Earl of Peterborough 1714–1715
 Thomas Fane, 6th Earl of Westmorland 1715–1735
 John Montagu, 2nd Duke of Montagu 1735–1749
For later custodes rotulorum, see Lord Lieutenant of Northamptonshire.

References
Institute of Historical Research - Custodes Rotulorum 1544-1646
Institute of Historical Research - Custodes Rotulorum 1660-1828

Northamptonshire